Mankind's Audio Development was developed in 1984 by Rob Hickson (vocals) and Pete Waddleton (bass) of gothic rock group Play Dead and signed on to Criminal Damage Records. Mankind's Audio Development was also known as "M.A.D." for short and featured the backing vocals of Michelle Ebeling (singer, Look Back in Anger). The group released one 12" single called "Sunfeast/Craving Single". It was the only known single recorded by M.A.D. The two songs "Sunfeast" and "Craving" were never released on CD. Hickson and Waddleton had made plans to make sequels to this single with completely different sounds and they were also planning to re-release the first single under their new independent label Tanz, depending on the band's condition after the release of Company of Justice. Sequels were never produced when Play Dead dissolved in January 1986.

The single was recorded at Blackwing Studios in July 1984 and produced by John Fryer and M.A.D.

Discography
1984 - "Sunfeast/Craving Single" (12") (CRI 12-121)
1984 - "Sunfeast/Craving Single" (7")

Track listing
 "Sunfeast" - 3:48
 "Craving" - 6:31

Personnel
Rob Hickson - vocals
Pete Waddleton - bass
Michelle Ebeling - backup vocals
John Fryer and M.A.D. - producer

External links
Record information on Mankind's Audio Development

British dark wave musical groups
English gothic rock groups